Alvin "Junior" Raglin (March 16, 1917 - November 10, 1955) was an American swing jazz double-bassist.

Raglin started out on guitar but had picked up bass by the mid-1930s. Raglin remained in Ellington's employ from 1941 to 1945.

After leaving Ellington's orchestra, Raglin led his own quartet, and also played with Dave Rivera, Ella Fitzgerald, and Al Hibbler. He briefly returned to perform with Ellington in 1946 and 1955. Raglin fell ill in the late 1940s and quit performing; he died in 1955 at age 38. He never recorded as a leader.

References

Scott Yanow, [ Junior Raglin] at Allmusic

1917 births
1955 deaths
American jazz double-bassists
Male double-bassists
Duke Ellington Orchestra members
20th-century American musicians
20th-century double-bassists
American male jazz musicians
20th-century American male musicians